Orange Sector is a German EBM band from Hannover, Germany formed in 1992.

History 

Martin Bodewell and Lars Felker met in 1992 at an underground club named "Index" in Hannover, Germany. The pair discovered that they had similar tastes in music and decided to work together in their musical efforts. Influenced by fellow German acts DAF and Extrabreit, as well as EBM stalwarts Nitzer Ebb, the pair produced a demo tape as Orange Sector — entitled The War Comes Home  — and sent it to the German electronic music label Zoth Ommog. Zoth Ommog label head, Andreas Tomalla (aka Talla 2XLC), liked the demo and offered a record deal to Bodewell and Felker.

Over the next two years, the band released two albums on Zoth Ommog: Faith in 1993 and Flashback in 1994. Both were produced by André Schmechta (aka Sevren Ni-Arb) of X Marks the Pedwalk in his T.G.I.F. Studio, which was a production nexus for many EBM bands in the early 1990s.

By 1997, Felker left the band to attend to personal and professional affairs, leaving Bodewell to continue the project alone. Orange Sector released several more albums as a solo venture of Bodewell's: Love It! which was released by Synthetic Symfony, and Scars of Love and Masquerade which were released on Zoth Ommog. The style of these albums differed from the initial, EBM heavy output during Felker's involvement and turned away some fans of the earlier work. By the end of the nineties, Bodewell ceased activities as Orange Sector.

In 2004, Torben Schmidt of Lights of Euphoria and founder of Infacted Recordings contacted Felker with interest in releasing a compendium of early Orange Sector work. This led to the compilation release Here We Are [Back Again] and a regenerated Orange Sector under the Infacted label. Here We Are peaked at #10 on the German Alternative Charts (DAC) and ranked #64 on the DAC Top Singles for 2005.

Under the Infacted banner the band released a stream of new studio albums: Bassprodukt (2006), Profound (2007), and Mindfuck (2009). Clubprodukt, an EP of extracts From Bassprodukt, peaked at #10 on the DAC. In 2010, the band dual-released Krieg & Frieden on both Infacted and on Metropolis Records in the United States, their first release on that label. Twenty years after their debut album Orange Sector released the maxi-EP, "Der Maschinist", as a lead-in to their tenth studio album Vorwärts Nach Weit.

2015 saw the release of Night Terrors and its accompanying EPs, Glasmensch and Monoton. These were followed by renewed touring activity in 2016. Glasmensch and Monoton were the first two parts of an EP "trilogy", the last of which was 2016's Farben.

In 2018 the band brought on René Nowotny as a third member. Nowotny, also of the band Ad:Key, had previously provided live support for Bodewell after Felker's initial departure. With Nowotny on board, the trio released their twelfth studio album, Alarm, in 2019. Alarm was regarded as the band's most "political" release to date, treating on subjects including racism and hateful politics sung in both German and English.

2021 saw the release of the album Alles Wird Geld. The album track "The Work Is Done" was subsequently released as an EP in 2022 and included a remix by the American band, Kreign.

Discography

Albums 
 The War Comes Home (1992, self-released)
 Faith (1993, Zoth Ommog)
 Flashback (1994, Zoth Ommog)
 Love It! (1997, Synthetic Symfony, Animalized)
 Scars of Love (1998, Zoth Ommog)
 Masquerade (1998, Zoth Ommog)
 Here We Are (Back Again) (2005, Infacted)
 Bassprodukt (2006, Infacted)
 Profound (2007, Infacted)
 Mindfuck (2009, Infacted, Machineries of Joy)
 Krieg & Frieden (2010, Infacted, Metropolis)
 Vorwärts Nach Weit (2013, Infacted)
 Night.Terrors (2015, Infacted)
 Alarm (2019, Infacted)
 Alles Wird Gold (2021, Infacted)
 The Work Is Done (2022, Infacted)

Singles and EPs 
 Kids in America (1994, Zoth Ommog)
 Für Immer Kalt Wie Stahl (2006, Infacted)
 Undertage (2008, Infacted)
 Der Maschinist (2012, Infacted)
 Gelle Zeit (2013, Infacted)
 Monoton (2015, Infacted)
 Glasmensch (2015, Infacted)
 Farben (2016, Infacted)
 Stahlwerk (2016, Infacted)
 Die Fahne (2018, Infacted)
 Zerstörer (2020, Infacted)

References

External links

[ Allmusic.com Orange Sector]
Official Orange Sector web page

Electronic body music groups
Metropolis Records artists
Zoth Ommog Records artists